Half of Cheltenham Borough Council is the local authority for Cheltenham in Gloucestershire, England. Half the council is elected every two years, while before 2002 the council was elected by thirds. Since the last boundary changes in 2002, 40 councillors have been elected from 20 wards.

Political control
Since the foundation of the council in 1973 political control of the council has been held by the following parties:

Leadership
The leaders of the council since 2001 have been:

Council elections
1973 Cheltenham Borough Council election
1976 Cheltenham Borough Council election
1979 Cheltenham Borough Council election
1983 Cheltenham Borough Council election (New ward boundaries)
1984 Cheltenham Borough Council election
1986 Cheltenham Borough Council election
1987 Cheltenham Borough Council election
1988 Cheltenham Borough Council election
1990 Cheltenham Borough Council election
1991 Cheltenham Borough Council election (New ward boundaries & borough boundary changes also took place)
1992 Cheltenham Borough Council election
1994 Cheltenham Borough Council election
1995 Cheltenham Borough Council election
1996 Cheltenham Borough Council election
1998 Cheltenham Borough Council election
1999 Cheltenham Borough Council election
2000 Cheltenham Borough Council election
2002 Cheltenham Borough Council election (New ward boundaries reduced the number of seats by 1)
2004 Cheltenham Borough Council election
2006 Cheltenham Borough Council election
2008 Cheltenham Borough Council election
2010 Cheltenham Borough Council election
2012 Cheltenham Borough Council election
2014 Cheltenham Borough Council election
2016 Cheltenham Borough Council election
2018 Cheltenham Borough Council election
2021 Cheltenham Borough Council election
2022 Cheltenham Borough Council election

Borough result maps

Changes between elections

1983 boundaries

1991 boundaries

2002 boundaries

References

By-election results

External links
Cheltenham Borough Council

 
Council elections in Gloucestershire
Politics of Cheltenham
Cheltenham